Dorothy M. Cray was a British writer of over 9 romance novels from 1962 to 1970. In 1963, her novel House Divided won the Romantic Novel of the Year Award by the Romantic Novelists' Association.

Bibliography

As Dorothy M. Cray

Single novels
 Morning Waits (1962)
 House Divided (1963)
 Place for Claire (1964)

As Dorothy Cray

Single novels
 A Fountain Troubled (1965)
 House of Many Windows (1966)
 Swan's Feather (1967)
 The freedom of Ruth Cardew (1968)
 Mirror on the Wall (1969)
 Escape from Yesterday (1970)

References and sources

British romantic fiction writers
RoNA Award winners
20th-century English novelists
20th-century British women writers
Women romantic fiction writers
British women novelists
Year of birth missing
Place of birth missing